Servant of God Carlo Crespi Croci (Legnano, Italy, May 29, 1891 –  Cuenca, Ecuador, April 30, 1982) was an Italian priest of the Pious Society of St. Francis de Sales.

Biography

Family 
Carlo Crespi was born in Legnano on May 29, 1891, the third of thirteen children in the household of Daniele Crespi, a worker on a local estate, and his wife Luisa Croci.

First years 
In 1907 he began the novitiate in Foglizzo and between 1909 and 1911 he studied philosophy in Valsalice, where he met and was a classmate of the priest René Ziggiotti, future successor of Don Bosco. On Sunday, January 28, 1917, he was ordained a priest.

In 1921, Crespi graduated in natural sciences with a specialization in botany from the University of Padua; after three months he also graduated in piano and composition at the Cesare Pollini Conservatory in Padua.

Priesthood 
He lived 60 years as a missionary in Ecuador, especially with indigenous people from the Ecuadorian Amazon. In addition to his religious work, he devoted himself to education, cinema, anthropology and archaeology. He is one of the first researchers of the Cueva de los Tayos, in Ecuador.

Legacy 
Crespi was one of the precursors of Ecuadorian cinema with his documentary Los invincibles shuaras del Alto Amazonas (1926). The images were recovered and preserved years after they were filmed.

His main work was fulfilled in Cuenca, where his memory is kept in monuments and in the name of different institutions.

Sainthood 
He is in the process of beatification by the Catholic Church.

Works 

 Carlo Crespi (1926). The Invincible Shuaras of the Upper Amazon (Documentary). Ecuador: Cinemateca Nacional del Ecuador, UNESCO.

Honours 

 Commander of the Order of Merit of the Italian Republic — Rome, 7 December 1981
 Doctorate Honoris Causa Post mortem: "For his contribution in the religious, social, cultural and scientific fields" — Salesian Polytechnic University, April 30, 2001

External links 
 Official website of his beatification cause

References 

1891 births
1982 deaths
Italian Servants of God